The Cuts were a rock band from Oakland, California.

The Cuts were formed by Carlos Palacios, Andy Jordan and Eric Johnson in 1998.  Johnson left the band and Palacios, Jordan, Carson Bell, Elizabeth Dotzler and Garrett Goddard solidified this initial lineup.  After winning a talent contest in 1999, the Cuts released their Heart Attack 7 on Lookout Records, "Probably the last good record that graced the Lookout label"..
The group went on tour with The Donnas in 1999 after which Bell left the band. The Cuts then recorded their first self-titled LP for Rock N Roll Blitzkrieg.  "Danny James" Aaberg replaced Dotzler on keys in late 2000, joining original members Jordan, Palacios and Godard. In 2001, the Cuts moved to El Paso to live cheaply and work on their writing, resulting in their second LP—Two Over Ten, which began the band's five-year stint with Birdman Records. Ben Brown joined up on lead guitar for the third Cuts album.  From Here On Out, released in 2006 with glowing reviews, was not enough to save The Cuts: later the same year, Danny James took his exit, and, after a couple gigs with keyboard wizard Joel Robinow, the Cuts decided to call it quits.  In 2012, The Cuts reunited for select dates.

Discography 
Heart Attack 7''', Lookout Records, 1999The Cuts ST, Birdman Records, 20012 Over Ten, Birdman Records, 2003I'm Not Down 7', Antenna Farm Records, 2005From Here on Out'', Birdman Records, 2006

References

External links
Birdman Records - The Cuts

Garage rock groups from California
Indie rock musical groups from California
Musical groups established in 1999
Musical groups from Oakland, California
Garage punk groups
Birdman Records artists
1999 establishments in California